Herbert Plank (born September 3, 1954) is a former Italian alpine skier who competed in the 1976 Winter Olympics and in the 1980 Winter Olympics.

Biography
In 1976 he won the bronze medal in the Alpine downhill event. That event did also count as a FIS Alpine World Championship. Four years later he finished sixth in the 1980 downhill competition.

Mr. Plank is the youngest winner of a male downhill race (Val d'Isère, December 10, 1973). He did win five downhill races in the World Cup; in the downhill races he could achieve to be second in nine and to be third in six times; he also did become second in the Alpine Combined at St. Anton am Arlberg on December 1, 1981. In other 25 races (within 6 Combined) he could finish in the Top Ten. 
He became second in the Downhill World Cup 1975/76 and third in the Downhill World Cup in the seasons 1973/74, 1974/75, 1977/78 and 1979/80. Because retiring after the season 1981/82, he didn't compete in Super-Gs. His son Andreas Plank (nickname Andy) is also an Alpine Skiing Racer; he became World Champion in the Downhill in the FIS Alpine Junior World Championships 2009.

See also
 Italy national alpine ski team at the Olympics
 Italian skiers who closed in top 10 in overall World Cup

References

External links
 

1954 births
Living people
Germanophone Italian people
Sportspeople from Sterzing
Italian male alpine skiers
Olympic alpine skiers of Italy
Alpine skiers at the 1976 Winter Olympics
Alpine skiers at the 1980 Winter Olympics
Olympic bronze medalists for Italy
Olympic medalists in alpine skiing
Medalists at the 1976 Winter Olympics
Alpine skiers of Centro Sportivo Carabinieri